The 1947 Davidson Wildcats football team was an American football team that represented Davidson University as a member of the Southern Conference during the 1947 college football season. In its second season under head coach William Story, the team compiled a 6–3–1 record (3–3–1 against conference opponents) and outscored opponents by a total of 155 to 108 The team played its home games at Richardson Stadium in Davidson, North Carolina.

Schedule

References

Davidson
Davidson Wildcats football seasons
Davidson Wildcats football